The National Rainbow Coalition–Kenya (NARC–Kenya) is a political party in Kenya. The party was formed after the defeat of the government-sponsored draft constitution. It was formed by National Rainbow Coalition members loyal to the government. The party, though months old, captured 3 parliamentary seats (Nakuru Town, Saku and North Horr) and 2 Civic seats in the by-elections of 24 July 2006 that was seen as a litmus test for the upcoming general elections for which the new party was planned to play a major role in securing reelection for president Mwai Kibaki.

By-election
During the by-elections of 24 June 2006, the party won three out of the five parliamentary posts up for grabs. Its candidates William Kariuki, Hussein Sasura and Ukur Yattani Kanacho won the Constituencies of Nakuru Town, Saku and North Horr.

Before the 2007 elections
Incumbent president Mwai Kibaki was expected to receive the party's nomination for another 5-year term. The party, however, never took off. Important figures around Kibaki were hesitant to join.
Thus a few months before the 2007 election, a new coalition by the name of Party of National Unity (PNU) was formed of which NARC-Kenya became a part. The party decided, however, to field a number of candidates under its own flag, thus contributing to the overall poor results for PNU in the parliamentary elections where parties affiliated to PNU competed against each other.

2007 elections
At the Kenyan general election, 2007, Narc-Kenya managed to enter three candidates into parliament.

Post 2008
In late 2008 PNU opted to register as a political party in its own right, to the opposition of several coalition parties including NARC-Kenya. Narc-Kenya opted to continue registering members in its own right electing Martha Karua as party leader in November 2008. Narc Kenya gained the distinction of being the first political party to apply for registration under the new political parties act passed as part of implementing Kenya's new constitution.

References

External links

narckeny.or.ke

Political parties in Kenya
Political parties established in 2005
2005 establishments in Kenya